American rock band Matchbox Twenty have released four studio albums, one compilation album, one box set, three video albums, two extended plays, twenty-four singles and nineteen music videos. The band released their debut studio album, Yourself or Someone Like You, in October 1996. The album's lead single "Long Day" was moderately successful, while the album's second single "Push" received large amounts of airplay in the United States. As it was not released for commercial sale, "Push" was deemed ineligible by American chart provider Billboard to appear on its main Hot 100 singles chart. It did, however, peak at number five on the Billboard Hot 100 Airplay chart and became a top-ten hit in countries such as Australia and Canada. With the success of "Push" and follow-up singles "3AM", "Real World" and "Back 2 Good", Yourself or Someone Like You eventually peaked at number five on the US Billboard 200 and was certified twelve-times platinum by the Recording Industry Association of America (RIAA).

Following the success of their debut album, Matchbox Twenty released their second studio album, Mad Season, in May 2000. The album was a commercial success, peaking at number three on the Billboard 200 and at number one in Australia. The album's lead single, "Bent", became the band's first number-one hit on the Billboard Hot 100. "If You're Gone", the album's second single, peaked at number five on the Hot 100. Mad Season spawned three more singles: "Mad Season", "Angry" and "Last Beautiful Girl". More Than You Think You Are, the band's third studio album, was released in November 2002 and peaked at number six on the Billboard 200, earning a double platinum certification from the RIAA. "Unwell", the album's second single, peaked at number five on the Hot 100. The extended play EP was released in November 2003, peaking at number forty-three on the Billboard 200. The video album Show: A Night in the Life of Matchbox Twenty was released in May 2004, topping the Billboard Top Video Albums chart.

Following a hiatus to allow lead singer Rob Thomas to focus on his solo career, Matchbox Twenty reunited to record six new songs for a compilation album. The resulting album, Exile on Mainstream, was released in October 2007; it peaked at number three on the Billboard 200. The album's lead single, "How Far We've Come", peaked at number eleven on the Hot 100 and was certified platinum by the RIAA; it became a top-ten hit in Australia and Canada. "All Your Reasons", the album's second single, became a top-forty hit in Australia. North, the band's fourth studio album, was released in September 2012 and became their first album to top the Billboard 200. North was preceded by the release of its lead single, "She's So Mean", which peaked at number forty on the Hot 100.

Albums

Studio albums

Compilation albums

Box sets

Video albums

Extended plays

Singles

Promotional Singles

Guest appearances

Music videos

Notes

References

External links
 Official website
 Matchbox Twenty at AllMusic
 
 

Discographies of American artists
Discography
Pop music group discographies
Rock music group discographies